Sirimeghavanna, also known as Kirthi Sri Meghavarna and Kithsirimevan was King of Anuradhapura in the 4th century. According to the traditional chronology, he ruled during 304–332 CE; the modified chronology adopted by modern scholars such as Wilhelm Geiger assigns his reign to 352–379 CE.

He succeeded his father Mahasena as King of Anuradhapura and was succeeded by his brother Jettha Tissa II.

After the death of King Mahasen, his son Siri Meghavanna came to power. He gathered Mahavihara bhikkus and asked them how he could rectify the damage caused by his father. Mahavihara bhikkus stated that Mahavihara and magnificent Lowa Maha Paaya were destroyed during his father's time. King Siri Meghavanna restored Mahavihara and Lowa Maha Paaya. He made a statue of Mahinda Thera and placed it in Mihintale.

Importance
The sacred relic of the tooth of the Buddha was brought to Sri Lanka during the reign of this king who welcomed it with great respect, ushered them to his capital and enshrined it in Meghagiri Viharaya, presently known as Isurumuniya in Anuradhapura. In order to honor the sacred tooth relic, an annual procession called dalada perahera begins from the era of this king.

Another creation of Siri Meghavanna is Egoda Kelaniya (එගොඩ කැලණිය) temple (Kithsiri Mewan Rajamaha Viharaya). The stupa enshrines Lord Buddha's Jalasatika Dhatu (ජලසාටිකා ධාතූන් වහන්සේ - නානකඩය) the bathing sarong. It is believed that the stupa surface is amazingly wet at all times of the year. There is a siripathula (සිරිපතුල) near this stupa, and if one visits the place do not miss to worship the siripathula also. The bodhi tree at this place is a wel-bodhi (වැල් බෝධී) and it is also believed that meditation gives very good results near it.

In popular culture
In the 2014 Sinhala film Siri Daladagamanaya, the role of Sirimeghavanna is played by Udara Rathnayake.

See also
 List of Sinhalese monarchs
 History of Sri Lanka

References

External links
 Kings & Rulers of Sri Lanka
 Codrington's Short History of Ceylon

Monarchs of Anuradhapura
S
Sinhalese Buddhist monarchs
S
S